The 1990 Norwegian Football Cup Final was the final match of the 1990 Norwegian Football Cup, the 85th season of the Norwegian Football Cup, the premier Norwegian football cup competition organized by the Football Association of Norway (NFF). The match was played on 21 October 1990 at the Ullevaal Stadion in Oslo, and opposed two Tippeligaen sides Fyllingen and Rosenborg. Rosenborg defeated Fyllingen 5–1 to claim the Norwegian Cup for a fifth time in their history.

Match

Details

References

1990
Football Cup
Rosenborg BK matches
1990s in Oslo
Sports competitions in Oslo
October 1990 sports events in Europe